Écouché-les-Vallées is a commune in the department of Orne, northwestern France. The municipality was established on 1 January 2016 by merger of the former communes of Batilly, La Courbe, Écouché (the seat), Loucé, Saint-Ouen-sur-Maire and Serans. On 1 January 2018, the former commune of Fontenai-sur-Orne was merged into Écouché-les-Vallées.

See also 
Communes of the Orne department

References 

Communes of Orne
Populated places established in 2016
2016 establishments in France